All I Wanna Do (originally titled The Hairy Bird) is a 1998 American comedy film written and directed by Sarah Kernochan. It stars Kirsten Dunst, Gaby Hoffmann, Monica Keena, Heather Matarazzo and Rachael Leigh Cook in an ensemble cast as students of the fictional Miss Godard's Preparatory School for Girls, and Lynn Redgrave as the school's headmistress. The film takes place in 1963 and focuses on several students' plotting and sabotage of a proposed merger for the school to go coed.

Originally titled The Hairy Bird, the film's screenplay, set in 1963, is based loosely on Kernochan's experiences at Rosemary Hall around that time. Filming was done in Toronto, Ontario, Canada at the Trafalgar Castle School in Whitby. The song "The Hairy Bird" plays during the film's end credits; it was written by Kernochan and sung by a group which includes Kernochan and five of her Rosemary Hall classmates, including Glenn Close.

The film was given a limited release on September 4, 1998 in the United States under the title All I Wanna Do (as its American distributor Miramax Films found the original title too offensive), and was then acquired by Buena Vista Home Entertainment who released it straight-to-video. In Canada and the United Kingdom (as well as for later streaming distribution in the U.S.), it was released under the title Strike!.

Plot 
In the winter of 1963 in New England, Odette "Odie" Sinclair is forcibly transferred by her parents to Miss Godard's Preparatory School for Girls after her parents find out that she has planned to have sex with her boyfriend, Dennis.  Upon arrival to the school, which is run by the stern but kind headmistress Miss McVane, Odette is introduced to her roommates, the intelligent and charismatic Verena von Stefan and the promiscuous Tinka Parker.  Verena and Tinka are the school's primary troublemakers; both mock an uptight hall monitor named Abigail "Abby" Sawyer, who has a penchant for tattletaling, and Verena regularly buys cigarettes from a lunch cook and is constantly late for classes.

After a brief hazing period, Odie is welcomed into the D.A.R. (Daughters of the American Ravioli), a club of several girls at the school who have greater aspirations than those of their peers; the members congregate in the school's attic, where they have access to canned ravioli stored above the cafeteria.  The club is led by Verena, and consists of several other girls, including Theresa "Tweety" Goldberg, a bulimic who self-induces vomiting by drinking ipecac syrup and plans to be a child psychologist; and Maureen "Momo" Haines, a well-spoken science nerd and aspiring biologist.  Verena has plans to start a fashion magazine like Vogue, while Tinka plans to be an "actress-folk singer-slut".  Odette declares her interest in politics, but pines to finish what she started with Dennis and lose her virginity.

The D.A.R. begins planning a rendezvous for Odie and Dennis, but when it is discovered that Miss Godard's is considering going co-ed with the nearby St. Ambrose boys' academy, the girls become divided on the matter and ultimately the club breaks up, leaving Verena and Momo to plan a sabotage for an upcoming dance with the St. Ambrose boys.  Meanwhile, the board of trustees for the school, which include Abby's parents, deliberates on the matter.  Miss McVane detests the merger, but can do little about it because of the school's financial problems.

As the St. Ambrose dance arrives, Verena and Momo concoct a plan to cast the boys' academy in a bad light, by spiking the fruit punch with alcohol from the chemistry lab and feeding them Tweety's ipecac to induce vomiting during their choir performance; Verena then plants empty liquor bottles in their school bus.  The same night, Dennis arrives at the academy dressed in a St. Ambrose uniform and meets Odette for their rendezvous in the attic of the school.

Tweety and Tinka have a change of heart on the co-ed integration after Tweety is sexually assaulted and humiliated by some St. Ambrose students.  With the help of a group of teenage male townies called "The Flat Critters", led by Snake who has a crush on Tinka, they end up sending the intoxicated St. Ambrose boys home with a poor reputation.  Miss McVane recognizes Verena as the mastermind behind the sabotage.  Despite Miss McVane's appreciation for Verena's efforts, she is forced to expel Verena for having been caught fraternizing in her undergarments with a St. Ambrose boy.

The following week at the end of the year ceremony, the announcement of the merger is made by Mrs. Sawyer, much to the disapproval of the girls, including Abby.  The students, led by Odie, hole up inside the school dormitories and demand a student body vote count as a single vote on the board of trustees.  Meanwhile, a media circus surrounds the school, and the board of trustees agree to a student vote.  Ultimately, the votes against the integration outnumber those for it, and the students donate their personal savings to help with the school's debt.

In an epilogue prior to the credits, the girls' fates are revealed: 
Verena goes on to publish Moi, one of the most-read women's publications in the world; 
Odette becomes a congresswoman and declares war on the tobacco industry; 
Momo is a scientist developing the first male oral contraceptive; 
Tinka, a famous actress, comes out to Barbara Walters in a 1979 interview; 
Tweety became a psychologist and wrote a best-seller about bulimia; 
Abby, a radical political activist, is serving a prison sentence for a 1970 bank holdup; 
and Miss Godard's remains a girls school whose graduates include thousands of corporate and community leaders.

Cast

Production 
All I Wanna Do was filmed in 1997 in Whitby and Toronto, primarily at the Trafalgar Castle School also at Loretto Abbey CSS (especially the chapel scenes), and was financed through Canadian distribution company Alliance Communications (renamed around the time of release to Alliance Atlantis, following the completion of Alliance's merger with Atlantis Communications). Nora Ephron served as an executive producer.

Release

Box office 
The film was picked up by Miramax Films for $3.5 million and was given a limited release in the United States on September 4, 1998 under the alternate title All I Wanna Do, as Miramax found the film's original working title, The Hairy Bird (which alluded to male genitalia), to be too offensive. It opened on 133 screens, grossing a total of $907,996 domestically. The film was released in Canada and the United Kingdom under the title Strike!. (The Canadian-British title became an alternative name for later releases on U.S.-based digital distribution platforms—such as Amazon Prime Video and YouTube—which often list it as "Strike! (aka All I Wanna Do)", though with the U.S. title being used in the opening credits.) Australia was the only country in which Miramax Films released the film under its original title.

In March 2000, the film was re-released in New York City at the United Artists Union Square Theater where it grossed $5,383 in its single week of screenings.

In 2019, director Sarah Kernochan said Miramax co-chairman Harvey Weinstein intentionally shelved the film, an incident which is detailed in Peter Biskind’s book Down and Dirty Pictures : Miramax, Sundance, and the Rise of Independent Film. While Weinstein was initially enthusiastic about the film and told Kernochan it would screen in 2,000 theaters across the U.S.; Miramax ultimately gave the film no publicity, and distributed the film in limited release, mostly in Canada. The film was eventually acquired by Disney and went straight-to-video.

Critical response 
On Rotten Tomatoes, the film has a score of 67% based on 12 reviews. On Metacritic, it has a score of 60% based on reviews from 6 critics. A. O. Scott of The New York Times noted that the film "mixes such prim old-fashioned naughtiness with more consequential misbehavior...  All I Wanna Do lurches between girl-power melodrama and bratty farce, but the ungainliness is part of the film's charm." He also noted that the film is "surprisingly pleasant, thanks to smart, unstereotyped performances – especially by Ms. Hoffmann and Ms. Dunst – and the filmmaker's evident respect and affection for her characters." Writing for the Australian publication The Age, Tom Ryan deemed the film "an appealing slice of nostalgia for a time when the world seemed ready for the taking for those with enough spunk to try."

Nathan Rabin of The A.V. Club favorably reviewed the film, noting that in its final act it "gains focus and momentum, becoming less a nostalgic celebration of female bonding than a boldly feminist teen sex comedy that isn't above the occasional group-vomiting scene. It improves steadily as it goes along, right up through an enormously satisfying ending that combines rousing rhetoric about the price of gender inequity and the power of group solidarity—and throws in a rowdy snobs vs. slobs setpiece worthy of Animal House."

References

External links 

 Script for the film, in PDF format, from the director's website
 Lyrics and MP3 for the title song, also from the director's website
 
 
All I Wanna Do at 20 at HeadStuff

1990s buddy comedy films
1990s coming-of-age comedy films
1990s teen comedy films
1990s female buddy films
1990s feminist films
1998 films
American coming-of-age comedy films
American female buddy films
American teen comedy films
Films set in boarding schools
Canadian coming-of-age comedy films
English-language Canadian films
1990s English-language films
Films about educators
Films about pranks
Films directed by Sarah Kernochan
Films scored by Graeme Revell
Films set in 1962
Films set in 1963
Films set in the United States
Films shot in Toronto
Miramax films
1990s American films
1990s Canadian films